The Myth of the American Sleepover is a 2010 American coming-of-age film written and directed by David Robert Mitchell. It had its world premiere at South by Southwest on March 13, 2010, and was released in the United States on July 22, 2011, by IFC Films.

Plot
Four young people navigate through suburban Detroit, in search of love and adventure on the last weekend of summer vacation.

Cast
 Claire Sloma as Maggie
 Marlon Morton as Rob Salvati
 Amanda Bauer as Claudia
 Brett Jacobsen as Scott Holland
 Nikita Ramsey as Ady Abbey
 Jade Ramsey as Anna Abbey
 Annette DeNoyer as Beth
 Wyatt McCallum as Marcus
 Mary Wardell as Jen Holland
 Douglas Diedrich as Steven
 Dane Jones as Emma
 Shayla Curran as Janelle Ramsey
 Drew Machak as Andy
 Christopher Simon as Sean Barber
 Madi Ortiz as the Grocery Store Girl
 Amy Seimetz as Julie

Critical reception

On review aggregator Rotten Tomatoes, the film holds an 81% score based on 48 reviews with an average rating of 6.9/10. The site's critical consensus reads "Somber and sweet, The Myth of the American Sleepover authentically evokes adolescence -- and all of the awkwardness and heartbreak that comes with it."

References

External links

2010 films
2010s coming-of-age comedy-drama films
2010s teen comedy-drama films
2010 directorial debut films
2010 independent films
American coming-of-age comedy-drama films
American independent films
American teen comedy-drama films
Films directed by David Robert Mitchell
Films set in Detroit
Films shot in Michigan
2010s English-language films
2010s American films